Milagrosa (formerly named Tulo) is an industrialized barangay located on the south edge of the city of Calamba, Laguna, Philippines. The barangay's name was changed from Tulo to Milagrosa through a plebiscite held on 3 December 2011. It houses various housing projects by Pag-Ibig such as in Barangay Barandal, Palo Alto, Majada-Labas and Canlubang.

Geography
Neighboring Barangays:
West - Punta, Kay-Anlog
East - La Mesa, Maunong, Saimisim
South - Makiling
North - Turbina

Population

Establishments
 AXEIA - Is a group of companies for housing. AXEIA development corporation and basic housing or Asiatic land .It is located at Barangay Milagrosa, Calamba, Laguna.
 National University Laguna - is the first NU university outside of Metro Manila, Its situated at Bo. Milagrosa (Tulo), Calamba, Laguna.

References

External links
Official Website of the Provincial Government of Laguna

Barangays of Calamba, Laguna